Antony Joasaph I Kokkas, (? – after 1463) was Ecumenical Patriarch of Constantinople in the 1460s. The exact dates of his reign are disputed by scholars at various times ranging from 1462 to 1465.

Life
Antony Kokkas was born probably to Western parents and he became a monk. According to Laurent and Kiminas he was elected as Patriarch with the name of Joasaph on 1 April 1462, in a rush the day after the death of Patriarch Isidore II. During his patriarchate he had to face troubles caused by clashes with monks and intrigues of the Greek nobility.

The intrigue that led to the tragic end of Joasaph's patriarchate involved the scholar and politician George Amiroutzes, renowned for having persuaded Emperor David of Trebizond to surrender to the Ottomans, and who, along with all the nobility of the former Empire of Trebizond, had moved to Istanbul. George Amiroutzes had become an intimate of Sultan Mehmed II and wanted to marry the beautiful Mouchliotissa, widow of last Duke of Athens Franco Acciaioli, notwithstanding that he was already married and his wife was still alive. Patriarch Joasaph refused to grant his permission because it was a case of bigamy under canon law. George Amiroutzes pressed forward and turned to his cousin, the Grand Vizier Mahmud Pasha Angelović, who tried to influence the Holy Synod to depose Joasaph. Some scholars propose different details for these events.

Irritated by the refusal of Joasaph to allow the new marriage of Amiroutzes, Sultan Mehmed II ordered the Patriarch's humiliation by cutting his beard, and punished also the Megas Ekklesiarches (i.e. Head Sacristan) Manuel, the future Patriarch Maximus III, by cutting his nose. These events led Joasaph to a state of depression which culminated in his attempted suicide: the day of Easter 1463 (10 April) he deliberately threw himself in the cistern beneath the Pammakaristos Church.

Joasaph was rescued, deposed and exiled to Anchialos, opening the way for George Amiroutzes to marry his new wife.

Disputed chronology
The chronology of the reign of Joasaph I Kokkas is disputed among scholars. Recent scholarship, such as Kiminas (2009), Podskalsky (1988), Laurent (1968) and Runciman (1985) place the reign of Joasaph I Kokkas after Isidore II and before Sophronius I, dating it between April 1462 and Easter 1463.

Other scholars, following Bishop Gemanos of Sardeis (1933–8) and Grumel (1958), as well as the official website of the Ecumenical Patriarchate, propose that Joasaph I reigned after Sophronius I and before Mark II, suggesting that his reign begun in early 1465 (or July 1465) and ended in first months of 1466. Blanchet (2001) places the beginning of the reign of Joasaph in summer 1464 directly after Sophronius.

Furthermore, there is no consensus among scholars on the length and chronology of the second and third terms of Gennadius Scholarius which supposedly alternated the patriarchates of Joasaph and Sophronius. For a comparison of the main scholar suggestions, see the List of Patriarchs of Constantinople.

Notes

Sources

 
 
  

15th-century patriarchs of Constantinople
15th-century Byzantine people